Miss Venezuela 2003 was the 50th Miss Venezuela pageant, was held in Caracas, Venezuela, on 16 October 2003. The pageant was won by Ana Karina Añez of Lara, who was crowned by outgoing queen Mariangel Ruiz of Aragua. 32 delegates competed for the crown marking the biggest turnout in the pageant's 51-year history. Miss Trujillo Francys Sudnicka would go on to become Miss Poland Universe 2006 and Miss Poland Earth 2006 where she placed in the top 8.

Results

Special awards
 Miss Photogenic (voted by press reporters) - Hilda Fleitas (Miss Vargas)
 Miss Internet (voted by www.missvenezuela.com viewers) - Valentina Patruno (Miss Miranda)
 Miss Popularity (voted by SMS Messages) - Valentina Patruno (Miss Miranda)
 Miss Congeniality (voted by Miss Venezuela contestants) - Ana Indira Sánchez (Miss Bolívar)
 Miss Personality - Eleidy Aparicio (Miss Costa Oriental)
 Best Smile - Hilda Fleitas (Miss Vargas)
 Miss Figure - Paola Cipriani (Miss Dependencias Federales)
 Miss Elegance - Ana Karina Añez (Miss Lara)
 Best Face - Valentina Patruno (Miss Miranda)
 Best Skin - Mercedes Pulido (Miss Distrito Capital)
 Best Hair - Pamela Djalil (Miss Sucre)

Delegates
The Miss Venezuela 2003 delegates are:

Notes
Valentina Patruno placed as semifinalist in Miss World 2003 in Sanya, China. She previously won Miss Italia Nel Mondo 2001 in Salsomaggiore, Italy.
Eleidy Aparicio placed as finalist in World Coffee Queen 2004 in Houston, Texas, United States.
Silvana Santaella won Miss Italia Nel Mondo 2004 in Salsomaggiore, Italy. She also placed as 2nd runner up in Reinado Internacional del Café 2004 in Manizales, Colombia, and 2nd runner up in Miss Earth 2007 in Quezon City, Philippines.
María Fernanda Tóndolo placed as 1st runner up in Reina Sudamericana 2003 in Santa Cruz, Bolivia.
Paola Cipriani placed as 3rd runner up in Reina Internacional de la Caña de Azúcar 2003 in Cali, Colombia.
Ana Indira Sánchez won Miss Mash Queen International 2004 in Georgetown, Guyana. She also placed as 1st runner up in Miss Mundo Latino Internacional 2004 in Toronto, Ontario, Canada.
Marinely Rivas placed as semifinalist in Miss Bikini International 2006 in Humen, China.
Tania Destongue placed as semifinalist in Miss Tourism International 2003 in Kuala Lumpur, Malaysia.
Carolina Chópite previously won Miss Globe International 2000 in Kyrenia, Northern Cyprus.
Ingrid Mora previously placed as semifinalist in Miss Teen International 2002 in San José, Costa Rica.
Francys Barraza Sudnicka won Miss Tourism World 2000 in St. Paul's Bay, Malta. She also won Miss Poland 2005, represented the country in Miss Universe 2006 in Los Angeles, California, United States and placed Top 8 in Miss Earth 2006 in Manila, Philippines.

References

External links
Miss Venezuela official website

2003 beauty pageants
2003 in Venezuela